The International Seafarers' Welfare and Assistance Network (ISWAN) is an international NGO and UK registered charity that aims to assists seafarers and their families. ISWAN is the result of a merger between two organisations. These were the International Committee on Seafarers' Welfare (ICSW) and the International Seafarers Assistance Network (ISAN). ICSW was formed in 1973 and ISAN was established in the late 1990s. These two welfare bodies merged in April 2013 to form ISWAN. ISWAN's headquarters are in Croydon, Greater London.

ISWAN promotes seafarers welfare worldwide. ISWAN is a membership organisation with the International Chamber of Shipping (ICS), The International Transport Workers Federation (ITF) and the International Christian Maritime Association (ICMA) as core members. Any maritime organisation that is involved with setting standards for welfare for seafarers is eligible to join.

ISWAN runs a welfare service SeafarerHelp. ISWAN also runs the Seafarer Emergency Welfare Fund, produces health information for seafarers, and provides information on the location of seafarer centres. ISWAN works with its members for the implementation of the ILO Maritime Labour Convention 2006, which is designed to provide workers rights and standards in the maritime industry. In August 2015 ISWAN merged with the Maritime Piracy Humanitarian Response Program (MPHRP) and this is now a program under the ISWAN banner. There is an Emergency Fund for survivors of piracy and their families that is co-ordinated by the MPHRP.

Funding 
ISWAN is funded by membership subscriptions, grants from foundations, sponsorship, and earned income.

Research and projects 
ISWAN engages in studies, research and projects related to seafarer welfare, including conditions on board ships, health and gender issues. These include:
 Women Seafarers' Health and Welfare survey was conducted with International Maritime Health Association, the ITF, and Seafarers Hospital Society in 2015
 HIV/Aids pilot project
 Port Levies and Sustainable Welfare conducted in 2013
 International Port Welfare Partnership project in conjunction with the International Transport Workers' Federation Seafarers' Trust (ITFST) and managed by the Merchant Navy Welfare Board (MNWB).

Events and Activities 
ISWAN runs events during Seafarer Awareness Week  as part of The International Maritime Organisations' (IMO) Day of the Seafarer day  which is recognised by the United Nations as an official international day.

The International Seafarers' Welfare Awards are an annual event funded by the ITF Seafarers' Trust. Other supporters involved include the IMO, International Chamber of Shipping, and the International Labour Organisation amongst other maritime bodies. The awards have four main categories- Seafarer Centre of the Year, Port of the Year, Shipping Company of the Year and the Dierk Lindemann Welfare Personality of the Year. The awards are designed to recognise good practise in seafarer welfare.

The Day of the Seafarer is a 2016 event for Filipino seafarers and families, and will be held in Manila. The previous Day of the Seafarer event was called 'Party in the Park', and was held in Manila in 2010.

References

External links 
 SeafarerHelp
 ISWAN 
 International Chamber of Shipping 
 ITF
 ICMA

Sailing associations